Pavle Markov (born 25 March 1973) is a politician in Serbia. He served in National Assembly of Serbia from 2012 to 2013, was the mayor of Kikinda from 2013 to 2020, and is now a member of the City Assembly of Kikinda. Markov is a member of the Serbian Progressive Party (Srpska napredna stranka, SNS).

Early life and career
Markov was born in Novi Sad, in what was then the Socialist Autonomous Province of Vojvodina in the Socialist Republic of Serbia, Socialist Federal Republic of Yugoslavia. He was raised in Kikinda and later graduated from the University of Belgrade Faculty of Law. He has practiced law since 2000.

He served as head of Kikinda's local administration on a non-partisan basis from 2004 to 2008.

Politician
Markov was given the seventy-ninth position on the Progressive Party's Let's Get Serbia Moving electoral list in the 2012 Serbian parliamentary election. The list won seventy-three mandates, and he was not initially elected. He also appeared in the first position on the SNS list in Kikinda in the concurrent 2012 Serbian local elections and was elected when the list won twelve mandates. The local government was formed by the Democratic Party (Demokratska stranka, DS) after the election, and the SNS served in opposition.

The Progressives formed a coalition government with the Socialist Party of Serbia (Socijalistička partija Srbije, SPS) at the republic level after the 2012 election, and a number of its parliamentarians resigned to take ministerial positions. Markov was awarded a mandate on 30 June 2012 as the replacement for another party member. He served in parliament for the next year as a supporter of the administration.

Shifting political affiliations in Kikinda brought the Progressives to power in September 2013, and Markov was chosen as the municipality's mayor. He resigned his seat in the national assembly on 1 October as he was unable to hold a dual mandate. In early 2016, he oversaw Kikinda's transition from a municipality to a city.

Markov led the Progressives to a majority victory in Kikinda in the 2016 local elections and was confirmed for another term as mayor afterwards. In 2018, he accepted on behalf of the city the European Union's flag of honour from a representative of the Parliamentary Assembly of the Council of Europe (PACE). During this term.

He once again led the SNS list for Kikinda in the 2020 local elections and was re-elected when the list won a majority victory with twenty-eight out of thirty-nine mandates. He stood down as mayor following the election and continues to serve as a member of the city assembly.

References

1973 births
Living people
People from Kikinda
Members of the National Assembly (Serbia)
Mayors of places in Serbia
Serbian Progressive Party politicians